United States gubernatorial elections were held in 1918, in 32 states, concurrent with the House and Senate elections, on November 5, 1918 (September 9 in Maine).

Results

See also 
1918 United States elections
1918 United States Senate elections
1918 United States House of Representatives elections

Notes

References 

 
November 1918 events
United States home front during World War I